Tropic of Capricorn is a BBC television documentary series. It was aired on BBC Two in 2008 and showed presenter Simon Reeve travelling along the Tropic of Capricorn.

Countries visited
In order of visiting:
Namibia
Botswana
South Africa
Mozambique
Madagascar
Australia
Chile
Argentina
Paraguay
Brazil

Journey
In Episode 1 Simon crossed Namibia and Botswana visiting Swakopmund and the Namib-Naukluft National Park before heading to Windhoek, the bustling capital city of Namibia known for its mix of German architecture and its sprawling informal settlements. In Botswana he met the San People who had been forced to abandon much of their way of life and then went to a diamond mine.

In Episode 2 Simon crossed the Limpopo region of South Africa visiting Louis Trichardt and being surprised at how black the town was. He meets an Afrikaans family to discuss danger issues before moving to Musina and witnesses Zimbabweans fleeing from Bulawayo for Johannesburg. He visits a couple of wildlife sanctuaries in Kruger National Park and then heads into the Limpopo National Park in Mozambique to meet villagers facing eviction. He heads to the coast on the N1 and discovers how unindustrialized Mozambique is before heading to the Bazaruto Archipelago and meeting villagers who have been betrayed by 5* hotels. In Madagascar he explores Antananarivo- a mix of Paris and hell. He flies to Toliara and sees the spikey forest and then visits the sapphire mines of Ilakaka, the town of Fianarantsoa and finishes on the Fianarantsoa-Côte Est railway and finishes in Manakara discovering how important the train is to the environment and local trade.

References
 BBC TV programmes: Tropic of Capricorn

Independent TV review

External links
 

2008 British television series debuts
2008 British television series endings
BBC television documentaries
British travel television series
English-language television shows
Television shows set in Argentina
Television shows set in Australia
Television shows set in Botswana
Television shows set in Brazil
Television shows set in Chile
Television shows set in Madagascar
Television shows set in Mozambique
Television shows set in Namibia
Television shows set in Paraguay
Television shows set in South Africa